The Albert Dock Traffic Office is a 19th-century Grade I listed building located in Liverpool, England. As part of a series of other buildings it makes up part of the Albert Dock. Formally the former home of Granada Television the building is now owned by National Museums Liverpool.

In 2021 it was announced the building would be renamed to the Dr Martin Luther King Jr Building.

History 
Completed in 1847 by architect Phillip Hardwick the building was initially designed for use within the then newly built Albert Dock which had opened just a year prior. Failing profitability of the dock resulted in its closure post World War Two however a regeneration scheme during the 1980s saw the complex refurbished and occupied by Granada Television. After Granada relocated to neighbouring Manchester the building used briefly used by television show This Morning before buying sold on as part of a cost-cutting measure.

In 2008 the building was sold to the International Slavery Museum and now display some of the museum's exhibitions.

Architecture 
Set across three stories; the third of which added a year after it completion, the building is of red brick with 5 x 7 bay windows. The buildings façade features a Tuscan portico and frieze with four columns constructed of cast iron.

References 

Grade I listed buildings in Liverpool
Buildings and structures completed in 1847